Bishunpurwa is a village in Narkatiganj block of West Champaran district in the Indian state of Bihar.

Demographics
As of 2011 India census, Bishunpurwa had a population of 1714 in 308 households. Males constitute 50.64% of the population and females 49.35%. Bishunpurwa has an average literacy rate of 50.58%, lower than the national average of 74%: male literacy is 60.4%, and female literacy is 39.5%. In Bishunpurwa, 21% of the population is under 6 years of age.

References

Villages in West Champaran district